Halliburton Field  (Duncan Municipal Airport) is in Stephens County, Oklahoma, United States, two miles south of Duncan, which owns it.

Historical airline service 

Duncan received scheduled commercial airline flights between 1954 and 1973. Central Airlines began service in 1954 using Douglas DC-3s on flights to Dallas and Fort Worth, as well as to Oklahoma City, with a stop in Lawton.

In 1967 Central merged into the original Frontier Airlines, which used Convair 580 aircraft on its flights until ending service in 1972. Mid-Continent Airlines, a small commuter airline at the time, provided flights to Dallas, Oklahoma City, and Altus, Oklahoma for a time in 1973. Since then Duncan has not seen regular air service.

Facilities
Its single runway, 17/35, is 6,650 x 100 ft (2,027 x 30 m) concrete.

In the year ending November 29, 2007 the airport had 8,750 aircraft operations, average 23 per day: 97% general aviation and 3% air taxi. 58 aircraft were then based at the airport: 81% single-engine, 14% multi-engine, 3% jet and 2% helicopter.

References

External links 

Airports in Oklahoma